KidsWorld Sports is a 26-episode television series for young teens. Each episode features two children from around the globe, who strive for greatness in their chosen sport. The show profiles kids who have the potential to become tomorrow's sport heroes. The show was produced by Breakthrough Films and Television in Toronto, Canada. It aired on August 8, 2004.

The show was first produced with Discovery Kids UK and BBC Kids, and has since aired around the world on various channels.

Episode synopses 
 Episode 1: Olivier (Wakeboarder) & Fabien (Mountain Biker) (August 8, 2004)
 Episode 2: Wacey (Bull Rider) & Benjamin (Freestyle Kayaker) (August 15, 2004)
 Episode 3: Jeff (Baseball Player) & Bertrand (Summer "Grass" Skier) (August 22, 2004)
 Episode 4: Jake (Mountaineer) & Cedric (Go Kart Racer) (August 29, 2004)
 Episode 5: Tyler (Motocross) & Sabrina (Horse Acrobat) (September 5, 2004)
 Episode 6: Erin (Waterskiing) & Maxime (Spelunking) (September 12, 2004)
 Episode 7: Nina (Skateboarding) & Axelle & Laura (Track & Field Athletics) (September 19, 2004)
 Episode 8: Sarah (Equestrian) & Coralie (Gymnastics) (September 26, 2004)
 Episode 9: Thaine (Football) & Laure (Swimming) (October 3, 2004)
 Episode 10: Sarah (Skeleton) & Isabelle (Naginata) (October 10, 2004)
 Episode 11: Kristen (Rugby) & Stéphane (Inline Skating) (October 17, 2004)
 Episode 12: Colin (Triathlon) & Nathan (Sledge Hockey) (October 24, 2004)
 Episode 13: Connor (Mountain Bike) & Sarah (Tennis) (October 31, 2004)
 Episode 14: Natalie  (Shark Diver)  & Malik (Soccer) (November 7, 2004)
 Episode 15: Amanda  (Cross Country Skiing) & Freddy (Moringue) (November 14, 2004)
 Episode 16: Azucena (Karate) & Nicolas (Trial) (November 21, 2004)
 Episode 17: Shaun (Snowboarding) & Katie/Natasha (Sculling) (November 28, 2004)
 Episode 18: Michelle (Figure Skating) & Laure (Handball) (December 5, 2004)
 Episode 19: Eric (Basketball) & Jonathan (Badminton) (December 12, 2004)
 Episode 20: Sarah (Hockey) & Chloé (Judo) (December 19, 2004)
 Episode 21: Kiara (Dogsled) & Thomas (Fencing) (December 26, 2004)
 Episode 22: Joel (Freestyle Kayaking) & Fabien (Freestyle Skiing) (January 2, 2005)
 Episode 23: Robyn (Synchronized Swimming) & Jamal (Surfing) (January 9, 2005)
 Episode 24: Kaysi (Cheerleading) & Adam (Track Cycling) (January 16, 2005)
 Episode 25: Makenzie (Twirling) & Chelsea (Diving) (January 23, 2005)
 Episode 26: Caitlyn (Wrestling) & Ricardo (Football) (January 30, 2005)

Selected crew 

Producers: Paul Kilback, Ira Levy, Peter Williamson
Directed by Paul Kilback
Edited by Jay Tipping, Jennifer Essex, Marc Dupont, David Grout

External links 
 Breakthroughfilms - Kidsworld Sports
 Breakthrough Films and Television
 

2000s Canadian children's television series
2004 French television series debuts
2004 Canadian television series debuts
2006 French television series endings
2006 Canadian television series endings
English-language television shows
French-language television shows
Television series about children